CRISPR Therapeutics AG is a Swiss–American biotechnology company headquartered in Zug, Switzerland. In fiscal year 2021, the company had revenues of $915 million, with net income of $378 million. By the end of the same year, the number of employees stood at 473. As of December 2021, the company had a market capitalization of over $6 billion. CRISPR Therapeutics' investors include German chemical company Bayer. The company operates R&D in Cambridge, Massachusetts.

History 
CRISPR Therapeutics was founded in 2013 as Inception Genomics by Emmanuelle Charpentier, Shaun Foy and Rodger Novak. Charpentier later shared the Nobel Prize in Chemistry in 2020 with Jennifer Doudna. As part of a working group, she provided the first scientific documentation on the development and use of CRISPR gene editing. This allows DNA to be specifically modified and exchanged, which can for example prevent diseases. The company CRISPR Therapeutics is to apply this new technology commercially and advance research.

In 2016, the company went public on NASDAQ. In August 2016 the company started to operate Casebia Therapeutics, as a joint venture with Bayer. In 2019, Casebia Therapeutics came directly under the control of CRISPR Therapeutics.

Products 
The company has several drugs in development. These include the drug CTX001 for the treatment of the rare blood disorders Beta thalassemia and sickle cell disease, which is being developed jointly with Vertex Pharmaceuticals. In May 2020, CTX001 received Orphan drug Designation from the U.S. Food and Drug Administration for transfusion-dependent beta thalassemia and from the European Medicines Agency for sickle cell disease and transfusion-dependent beta thalassemia. Early clinical trial results support the safety and efficacy of this treatment.

See also
Editas Medicine
Intellia Therapeutics

References 

Companies listed on the Nasdaq
Swiss companies established in 2013
Biotechnology companies of Switzerland

Companies based in Zug
Genomics companies
Biotechnology companies established in 2013
2013 establishments in Switzerland
2016 initial public offerings